Cristești is a commune in Mureș County, Transylvania, Romania that is composed of two villages:
Cristești
Vălureni / Székelykakasd

Geography
The commune is located in the center of the department, on the left side of the Mureș river, on the Plateau of Transylvania (Podișul Transilvanei), 5 km south-west of Târgu Mureș, the capital of the county, of which it is a suburb.

Cristești is crossed by the national road DN15 (European Route 60) which connects Târgu Mureș with Turda and Cluj-Napoca.

History
The first written mention of the village dates from 1332 under the name of Santa Cruce.
The municipality of Cristești belonged to the Kingdom of Hungary, then to the Empire of Austria and to the Austro-Hungarian Empire.
In 1876, during the administrative reorganization of Transylvania, it was attached to the county of Maros-Torda.
The municipality of Cristești joined Romania in 1920, at the Treaty of Trianon, during the disintegration of Austria-Hungary. After the Second Vienna Arbitration, it was again occupied by Hungary from 1940 to 1944, during which time the small Jewish community was exterminated by the Nazis. It became Romanian again in 1945.

Demographics
The commune has a relative Székely Hungarian majority. 
In 1910, the commune had 363 Romanians  (24.69%) and 1053 Hungarians (71.63%).

In 1930, there were 461 Romanians (26.51%), 1164 Hungarians (66.94%), 7 Jews (0.70%) and 104 Roma (5.98%).

According to the 2002 census, it has a population of 5,591 of which 2421 Romanians (43.30%), 2767 Hungarians (49.49%) and 395 Roma (7.06%). On that date, there were 1,920 households and 1,888 dwellings..

Economy
The economy of the commune is mostly based on agriculture and trade and it is highly dependent on nearby Târgu Mureș.

See also 
 List of Hungarian exonyms (Mureș County)

Gallery

References

Communes in Mureș County
Localities in Transylvania